Year 1449 (MCDXLIX) was a common year starting on Wednesday (link will display the full calendar) of the Julian calendar.

Events 
 January–December 
 January 6 – Constantine XI Palaiologos is crowned Byzantine Emperor at Mistra; he will be the last in a line of rulers that can be traced to the founding of Rome.
 February – Alexăndrel seizes the throne of Moldavia, with the support of the boyars.
 March 24 – Hundred Years' War: English forces capture Fougères in Brittany.
 April 7 – The last Antipope, Felix V, abdicates.
 April 19 – Pope Nicholas V is elected by the Council of Basel.
 April 25 – The Council of Basel dissolves itself.
 May – An English privateering fleet led by Robert Wennington challenges ships of the Hanseatic League.
 May 14 – Second Siege of Sfetigrad (1449): The Albanian garrison surrenders and the Ottomans seize the fortress.
 May 20 – Battle of Alfarrobeira: King Afonso V of Portugal defeats the forces of Peter, Duke of Coimbra.
 July – Hundred Years' War: The French invade Normandy.
 August 13 – First Margrave War: Albrecht III Achilles, Elector of Brandenburg takes Lichtenau Fortress from Nuremberg.
 September 1 – Battle of Tumu Fortress: The Oirat Mongols defeat the  Ming dynasty army, and capture the Zhengtong Emperor of China; the latter is officially deposed, while his brother ascends as the Jingtai Emperor the next year.
 October – Bogdan II of Moldavia enters the country with troops from John Hunyadi, and takes the throne after Alexăndrel flees.
 October 29 – The French recapture Rouen from the English.

Births 
 January 1 – Lorenzo de' Medici, Italian statesman (d. 1492)
 January 17 – Osanna of Mantua, Italian Dominican tertiary (d. 1505)
 February 7 – Adriana of Nassau-Siegen, consort of Count Philip I of Hanau-Münzenberg (d. 1477)
 April 27 – Asakura Ujikage, 8th head of the Asakura clan of Japan (d. 1486)
 August 10 – Bona of Savoy, Duchess of Savoy (d. 1503)
 September 20 – Philipp I, Count of Hanau-Münzenberg, German noble (d. 1500)
 October 21 – George Plantagenet, 1st Duke of Clarence, brother of Edward IV of England and Richard III of England (d. 1478)
 November 11 – Catherine of Poděbrady, Hungarian Queen (d. 1464)
 November 14 – Sidonie of Poděbrady, Bohemian princess, duchess consort of Saxony (d. 1510)
 December 6 – Dorotea Gonzaga, Italian noble (d. 1467)
 date unknown 
 Aldus Manutius, Italian printer
 Archibald Douglas, 5th Earl of Angus (d. 1513)
Axayacatl, Aztec ruler of Tenochtitlan (d. 1481)
 Domenico Gagini, Italian sculptor (d. 1492)
 Domenico Ghirlandaio, Italian artist (d. 1494)
 Magnus Hundt, German physician and theologian (d. 1519)
 Margaret of Thuringia, Electress consort of Brandenburg (d. 1501)
 probable 
 Ilham Ghali khan of Kazan Khanate, (d. 1490)
 Srimanta Sankardeva, Assamese scholar and religious figure (d. c. 1568)
 Mandukhai Khatun, Mongolian queen

Deaths 
 January 4 – Cecilia of Brandenburg, Duchess of Brunswick-Wolfenbüttel (b. c.1405)
 January 21 – Giovanni Berardi, Archbishop of Taranto (b. 1380)
 February 2 – Ibn Hajar al-Asqalani, Islamic scholar (b. 1372)
 March – Dolce dell'Anguillara, Italian condottiero (b. 1401)
 May – Alexander of Islay, Earl of Ross, Lord of the Isles
 May 20 (at the Battle of Alfarrobeira)
 Álvaro Vaz de Almada, 1st Count of Avranches
 Peter, Duke of Coimbra (b. 1392)
 June 1 – Polissena Sforza, Lady of Rimini (b. 1428)
 August 13 – Louis IV, Elector Palatine (b. 1424)
 October 27 – Ulugh Beg, Timurid ruler and astronomer (b. 1394)
 October 31 – Elisabeth of Brandenburg, Duchess of Brzeg-Legnica and Cieszyn, German princess (b. 1403)
 November 19 – Kunigunde of Sternberg, first spouse of the King George of Podebrady (b. 1425)
 December 24 – Walter Bower, Scottish chronicler (b. 1385)

References